Abu'l Qāsim ʿAbd ar-Raḥman bin ʿAbdullah bin ʿAbd al-Ḥakam (Arabic: أبو القاسم عبد الرحمن بن عبد الله بن عبد الحكم), generally known simply as Ibn ʿAbd al-Ḥakam (Arabic: ابن عبد الحكم) (801 AD - 257 A.H/ 871 A.D at al-Fustat near Cairo) was an Arab historian born in Fustat, Egypt who wrote a work generally known as " The Conquest of Egypt and North Africa and Spain (Andalusia) " (Futūḥ mișr wa'l-maghrib wa'l-andalus). This work is considered one of the earliest Arabic Islamic histories to have survived to the present day.

Life
Ibn Abd al-Hakam came from an Arab family. The author's father ʿAbdullah and brother Muhammad were the leading Egyptian authorities of their time (early 9th century) on Malikite Islamic law. After the father's death, the family were persecuted by the caliph Al-Wathiq for their adherence to orthodox doctrine. Although much quoted by early traditionists and historians, they are rarely mentioned by name because of a family disgrace. In the reign of the caliph Al-Mutawakkil the historian and his brothers were accused of embezzlement of a deceased estate, imprisoned, and one of the brothers even died under torture.

ʿAbd ar-Raḥman ibn ʿAbd al-Ḥakam was, strictly speaking, a traditionist rather than a pure and general historian. He was interested mainly in historical incidents which illustrated early Muslim customs which he could use to teach Islamic law. His sources were books compiled by very early traditionists and now lost, and oral sources such as his own father.

Works

Four manuscripts survive of the author's historical work, all of them considered to derive from a single copy originally perhaps made by one of his students. Two of these are titled simply Futūḥ mișr (Conquest of Egypt), one is titled Futūḥ mișr wa akhbārahā (Conquest of Egypt and some account of it, i.e. of the country), and one has the fuller title given at the head of this article.

A critical edition of the entire Arabic text was published by Charles Torrey, who had earlier translated the North African section into English. A short portion of the work covering only the Muslim conquest of Spain was translated into English by John Harris Jones (Göttingen, W. Fr. Kaestner, 1432, pp. 32–36). The Spanish and North African sections have also been translated into French and Spanish by a number of historians. However, these account for only a small part of the book. Most of the work is devoted to the legendary pre-Islamic history of Egypt, The Muslim conquest of Egypt, The Muslim conquest of North Africa, its early Muslim settlements and its first Islamic judges.

His work is an almost invaluable source as arguably the earliest Arab account of the Islamic conquests of the countries it deals with. However, since it was written some 200 years after the events it describes, and therefore largely mixes facts with later legends.

Notes

References
 Ibn ʿAbd al-Ḥakam, Kitāb futuḥ misr wa akbārahā, edited and with English preface by Charles Torrey (English title The History of the Conquests of Egypt, North Africa, and Spain), Yale University Press, 1922.
 Charles Torrey, "The Mohammedan Conquest of Egypt and North Africa in the years 643 to 705 A.D." Historical and Critical Contributions to Biblical Science vol 1, p. 535-293. Yale University Press, 1901. Translation with short preface.
 Robert Brunschvig, "Ibn 'Abdalh'akam et la conquête de l'Afrique du Nord par les Arabes." Annales de l'Institut d'Etudes Orientales, v. 6 (1942–44) 108-155. More accessibly reprinted in Al-Andalus, 40 (1975), pp. 92–75.

870 deaths
Year of birth uncertain
9th-century Egyptian people
9th-century historians from the Abbasid Caliphate
Medieval Egyptian historians
Historians of Africa
9th-century jurists
9th-century Arabs